Location

Ouled Fadel is a village in The Batna Province Which Is also in the north eastern African country Algeria

History

The village is currently occupied by The Chaouia people which are the people who led the Algerian revolution and are the settlers of The Aurès Mountains Which are an eastern prolongation of the Atlas Mountains

Communes of Batna Province
Cities in Algeria
Algeria